Folkestone East is a former railway station in Folkestone, England. Opened by the South Eastern Railway in 1843 as part of its main line from London, it was Folkestone's first station and handled substantial boat train traffic travelling to the Continent via Folkestone Harbour. Passenger traffic declined in later years with the opening of other more convenient stations in the town and the station eventually closed in 1965.

History 
The South Eastern Railway (SER) opened the first permanent railway station in Folkestone in December 1843. Constructed high above the shore at the rear of the town, it was initially named Folkestone and replaced a temporary station built to the west pending the construction of Sir William Cubitt's 19-arch Foord viaduct. To the north of the station, the SER constructed a branch line to Folkestone Harbour which the railway company had purchased earlier the same year.

Until the harbour was provided with its own Harbour station in 1849, the SER's first station handled all the passenger traffic for both the town and the harbour, including the boat train traffic from Folkestone to Boulogne which was said to have carried over 20,000 people in the short space of five months. Following the opening of the Harbour station, Folkestone station was renamed Folkestone Old and then Folkestone Junction in recognition of its status at the head of an important branch leading to the now busy port. The opening of Folkestone Harbour took away all of the boat-train traffic and much of the town traffic from Folkestone Junction, the remainder being lost with the opening of Shorncliffe Camp (now known as Folkestone West) in 1863.

Goods traffic became the most important business at Folkestone Junction and extensive goods facilities were provided in the 1890s on the former site of the line's coking ovens which had become redundant when the perfection of coal-burning techniques put an end to the production of coke for locomotives. A shed was established on the down side of Folkestone Junction where a small stud of locomotives was kept to help services travelling to the harbour gather the necessary momentum to climb the 1 in 30 incline on the harbour branch. The shed closed in 1961 with the introduction of electric traction on the line.

In September 1962, Shorncliffe was renamed Folkestone West and Folkestone Junction became Folkestone East. The station closed to passengers three years later.

Present and future 
All the original station buildings dating from 1844 were demolished shortly after the station closing.  A short length of the down platform remained outside the signal box and was retained for use by staff. As at March 2017 most of the up platform was still in situ.

Various schemes for the re-use of the remaining land at Folkestone East have been proposed, from the site of a new depot, sidings for stabling and maintaining CTRL services and a new passenger station. The site of the former goods yard was offered for sale in January 2008.

References

External links 
 List of persons living at the station in 1861

Disused railway stations in Kent
Former South Eastern Railway (UK) stations
Railway stations in Great Britain opened in 1843
Railway stations in Great Britain closed in 1965
Folkestone
1843 establishments in England
1965 disestablishments in England